The Ranger 28 is an American sailboat, that was designed by Gary Mull as an International Offshore Rule Half Ton class racer and first built in 1976.

Production
The boat was built by Ranger Yachts in the United States. Ranger yachts was a division of Bangor Punta at the time. A total of 130 examples were completed before production ended in 1978.

Design
The Ranger 28 is a small recreational keelboat, built predominantly of fiberglass, with wood trim. It has a masthead sloop rig, an internally-mounted spade-type rudder on a skeg and a fixed fin keel. It displaces  and carries  of lead ballast.

Variants
Ranger 28
Standard model, with a PHRF racing average handicap of 180 with a high of 177 and low of 183.
Ranger 28 TM Serial numbers 1-86
Early tall mast model, with a PHRF racing average handicap of 183 with a high of 196 and low of 174.
Ranger 28 TM Serial numbers 87 and later
Later tall mast model with a deeper keel, with a PHRF racing average handicap of 180 with a high of 180 and low of 186.

See also
List of sailing boat types

References

Keelboats
1970s sailboat type designs
Sailing yachts
Sailboat type designs by Gary Mull
Sailboat types built by Ranger Yachts